Andrew Howard Western (born 18 March 1985) is a British politician of the Labour Party who was elected as Member of Parliament (MP) for Stretford and Urmston at the 2022 by-election. He had been the leader of Trafford Council since 2018, a post he vacated upon his election to parliament.

Early life
Western was born at Wythenshawe Hospital to Denise Western (née Firth) and Howard Western and grew up in Timperley. He had four sisters, and describes his upbringing as "modest", saying that "after my parents' divorce times were tough"; he benefited from the Education Maintenance Allowance and was the first member of his family to go to university. He attended the local grammar school, Altrincham Grammar School for Boys, before studying History and Politics at Sheffield University, graduating in 2006. He returned to Trafford after university, and prior to becoming council leader worked in project management within the engineering sector, focusing particularly on transport infrastructure. Western lives in the Urmston area in the village of Flixton.

Politics

Local government
Western joined the Labour Party in 2006, holding various roles at a branch and constituency level over the following 10 years.

He was first elected to Trafford Council at the 2011 local elections, representing Priory ward, which largely consists of Sale town centre.

Western was subsequently re-elected at both the 2015 and 2019 local government elections.

Western became Deputy Leader of the Labour Group on Trafford Council in May 2014, before becoming Labour Group Leader, and Leader of the Opposition, in November 2014.

At the 2018 local government elections , the Labour Party gained four seats from the Conservative Party, with the Tories suffering further losses to the Liberal Democrats and the Greens.

The Labour Party became the largest political group on Trafford Council, with the previously Tory-controlled authority being placed in a state of no overall control; Labour formed a minority-control administration governing the Council with the support of the Liberal Democrats in a confidence and supply arrangement. Western was confirmed as Council Leader shortly after the elections.

At the 2019 local government elections, the Labour Party made further gains in Trafford, securing an additional six seats from the Conservative Party. The Labour Group obtained a majority of council seats, and formed an outright administration governing the Council. This was the first time since the 2004 boundary changes that Labour had managed to win a majority of seats.

Western sits on the Greater Manchester Combined Authority and is presently the Portfolio Lead for Place Based Regeneration (Housing and Infrastructure) as well as Clean Air. Between May 2018 and May 2019, he served as Portfolio Lead for Digital. He led on Green City Region between 2019 and 2021, before leading on Digital, Works and Skills for the second half of that year. He sits on the Transport for the North Board, the Greater Manchester Transport Committee and the North West Regional Leaders Board.
 
In March 2019, Western publicly opposed the plans by Mayor of Greater Manchester Andy Burnham to make cuts to Greater Manchester Fire and Rescue Service.

Western is an active member of the Local Government Association, and as Chair of the LGA's Resources (Finance) Board is the cross-party lead on finance in local government. He also represents Labour councillors in North West England as the LGA Labour Group rep for the Region. In June 2022, Western became Chair of the GM Transport Committee, a committee of councillors overseeing public transport in the City Region.

Since 2019, Western has served as a non-executive director at Trafford Housing Trust. He serves as a school governor at Wellfield Infant and Nursery School in Sale.

Following his election to parliament in December 2022, Western resigned as leader of Trafford Council, being succeeded by Tom Ross.

Parliament
Western had twice sought election to Parliament before being elected, being the Labour candidate in Altrincham and Sale West at the 2017 and 2019 general elections. On both occasions, he retained the party's second place, but was defeated by incumbent MP Sir Graham Brady. The previously safe Conservative seat, had, however, become marginal. In 2019, he and Brady both lost ground to the Liberal Democrats and Greens.

On 26 June 2022, Western was selected to contest Stretford and Urmston after the upcoming retirement of incumbent Labour MP Kate Green at the next general election; Green resigned in November 2022, triggering a by-election, at which Western was the successful Labour candidate. He won the by-election with 69.6% of the vote.

Political views
Western supported Yvette Cooper in the 2015 Labour leadership election. In the 2020 leadership election, he supported Lisa Nandy for Leader, backing Angela Rayner in the deputy leadership contest.

Western endorsed Tony Lloyd in the 2016 Greater Manchester Labour Party mayoral selection.

In a speech to Stand Up to Racism Manchester, Western claimed to have "chased (Tommy Robinson) out of Trafford", and expressed his concern about Donald Trump and Boris Johnson, describing the latter as "far right".

Electoral history

References

External links
 
 

Living people
Councillors in Trafford
Labour Party (UK) councillors
Labour Party (UK) MPs for English constituencies
Leaders of local authorities of England
1985 births
Members of the Greater Manchester Combined Authority
UK MPs 2019–present